Nieuwenhuis or Nieuwenhuys is a Dutch surname cognate to English Newhouse and German Neuhaus. A great number of variant forms exist. "Nieuwen" can be replaced by Nei, Neij, Nein, Nie, Nien (e.g. Nienhuis), Nieuw, Nieuwe, Niewen, Nij (e.g. Nijhuis), Nijen (e.g. Nijenhuis), Nou and Nuwen. "Huis" can be Hues, Huijs, and Huys. Declensions may end with -se, -sen, -ze, and -zen (e.g. Nieuwenhuizen) and the name can start with van ("from"). Notable people with this name include:

Anton Willem Nieuwenhuis (1864–1953), Dutch explorer who crossed Borneo in 1896-97
Named after him: Nieuwenhuis' Bulbul (a bird), Bulbophyllum nieuwenhuisii (an orchid), and others
Berry Nieuwenhuys (1911–1984), South African football forward
Christiaan Benjamin Nieuwenhuis (1863–1922), Dutch photographer in the Dutch East Indies
Constant Nieuwenhuys (1920–2005), Dutch painter, sculptor, graphic artist, author and musician
 (1777–1857), Dutch theologian and logician, founder of the Domela Nieuwenhuis family
Jacques Nieuwenhuis (born 1980), Namibian rugby player
Jan Nieuwenhuys (1922–1986), Dutch abstract painter
Joris Nieuwenhuis (born 1996), Dutch racing cyclist
Kirk Nieuwenhuis (born 1987), American baseball player
Minnie Brinkhof-Nieuwenhuis (born 1952), Dutch racing cyclist, wife of Peter
 (1842–1924), Dutch-born Danish general and military historian
Peter Nieuwenhuis (born 1951), Dutch racing cyclist, husband of Minnie
Pim Nieuwenhuis (born 1976), Dutch competitive sailor
Rob Nieuwenhuys (1908–1999), Dutch novelist
Rudolf Nieuwenhuys (born 1927), Dutch neuroanatomist
Theo Nieuwenhuis (1866–1951), Dutch Art Nouveau painter and designer
Domela Nieuwenhuis
César Domela Nieuwenhuis (1900–1992), Dutch sculptor, painter, photographer, and typographer, son of Ferdinand
Ferdinand Domela Nieuwenhuis (1846–1919), Dutch Lutheran pastor and the Netherlands' first prominent socialist
 (1808–1869), Dutch Lutheran theologian, father of Ferdinand
 (1870–1955), Dutch Lutheran minister and flamingant

See also
 7541 Nieuwenhuis, main-belt asteroid named after Henk Nieuwenhuis (b. 1938), Dutch planetarium curator

References

Dutch-language surnames
Toponymic surnames

de: Nieuwenhuis
fr: Nieuwenhuis
nl: Nieuwenhuis
sv: Nieuwenhuis